Yuri (Yury, Yuriy) Petukhov (Petuhov) may refer to:
Yuri Aleksandrovich Petukhov (*19 February 1960) — Belarusian football player, then coach.
Yuri Dmitrievich Petukhov (May 17, 1951 – February 1, 2009) — Russian writer.